

List of England players at the World Team Table Tennis Championships
The tables below are the English representatives for the men's and women's teams during the World Table Tennis Championships also known as the Swaythling Cup and Corbillon Cup.

Men's team (Swaythling Cup)

npc = non playing captain
pc = playing captain

Women's team (Corbillon Cup)

References

World Table Tennis Championships